Luiz Cézar (born 11 July 1938) is a Brazilian boxer. He competed in the men's middleweight event at the 1964 Summer Olympics. At the 1964 Summer Olympics, he lost to Franco Valle of Italy.

References

1938 births
Living people
Brazilian male boxers
Olympic boxers of Brazil
Boxers at the 1964 Summer Olympics
Boxers at the 1963 Pan American Games
Pan American Games gold medalists for Brazil
Pan American Games medalists in boxing
Sportspeople from São Paulo
Middleweight boxers
Medalists at the 1963 Pan American Games
20th-century Brazilian people
21st-century Brazilian people